Grimball is a surname. Notable people with the surname include:

Elizabeth B. Grimball (1875-1953), American theatrical and film producer
John Grimball ( 1945), decorated American soldier
John A. Grimball (died 1867), American politician from Mississippi

See also
Paul Grimball House Ruins, archaeological site in South Carolina, United States
Battle of Grimball's Landing, 1863 battle at James Island, South Carolina
Battle of Grimball's Causeway, 1865 battle at James Island, South Carolina